The Sword of Saint Peter is a holy relic held in the Poznań Archdiocesan Museum.

It is claimed to be the sword with which the Apostle Peter cut off the right ear of the high priest's servant at the time of Jesus' arrest in Gethsemane. The sword is wide-tipped, similar in shape to a dussack or machete.  An exact copy of the sword, made by Bogdan Puchalski, is displayed on the wall of the Poznań Archcathedral Basilica.

History 
The sword is mentioned for the first time in 1609 in Vitae Episcoporum Posnaniensium of Jan Długosz as being the original Roman sword (Gladius) used by Saint Peter in the Gospels, or a direct copy made for Pope Stephen VII. However, at that time Stephen was already dead, and the current pope was John XIII.

The sword arrived in Poznań in 968 as a gift from John XIII for either Bishop Jordan or Duke Mieszko I. The Archdeacon of Poznań Cathedral in 1699 wrote about the sword, describing it as a part of Saint Peter's sword brought to Poznań by Bishop Jordan, where it was usually kept in the cathedral treasury, except for the few times a year when it was shown to the people. The 1721 Decree of Poznań Cathedral Chapter refers to having the sword moved to the chapter house as a more proper placement for the artifact.

Folklore
According to British folklore, St. Joseph of Arimathea brought the sword to Britain, and it was kept at Glastonbury Abbey for many years until the abbot gave it to Saint George.

Description 
 The blade was made from a single piece of iron with an added small cross-guard
 Total length: , it was probably 1 or 2 cm longer, but the tip of the sword was destroyed by corrosion
 Maximal width, at the tip: 

References

Further reading 
 

Poznań
Swords
Christian mythology
Christian relics
Saint Peter
Individual weapons
Gethsemane
Forgery controversies
Iron objects
Joseph of Arimathea